Thiago Moyses (born 11 October 1981) is a Brazilian filmmaker and film producer of international prominence.

Life, family and education
Moyses studied film at University of Brasília.

Film career

Moyses's first notable film was Sindrome de Pinocchio which was among other nine movies in Brazil's pre-selection for 2010's Foreign Language Nominee to Academy Awards. This movie was also selected to São Paulo International Film Festival in Brazil and Film B Festival in Santiago, Chile. He also directed the animated short "Kcrisis", introducing a new technique of rotoscoping and animation, achieving outstanding visual combined with an intriguing plot. He worked with Henry Preston designing special effects to the Brazilian feature film "A Última Estação", directed by Marcio Cury. His short films were in the spotlights of many festivals. He directed 10 short and 3 feature films.

Main filmography

Hopekillers (2020)
Contos da Morte  (2016)
Z.A.N. (2016)
Contos da Morte  (segment "A Morte do Homem," 2016)
Fabus (Short Film, 2014)
Phantastika (Short Film', 2011)
T. (Short Film, 2010)
Brasilia's Tale  (Short Film, 2010)
KCRisis (Short Film, 2010)
Centelha ('Short Film, 2009)
Sindrome de Pinocchio (2008)
Espectro (2008)Vide O Galeno  (Documentary short, 2007)Espiral (Short Film, 2004)Fobia'' (Short Fim, 2003)

Awards and nominations

References

External links

1956 births
Brazilian film directors
Brazilian film producers
Brazilian racing drivers
Living people
University of Brasília alumni
Superstars Series drivers
ADAC GT Masters drivers